The 2017 version of the Syrian Cup is the 47th edition to be played. It is the premier knockout tournament for football teams in Syria. Al-Wahda are the defending champions.

The competition has been disrupted because of the ongoing Syrian Civil War, where some games have been awarded as 3:0 victories due to teams not being able to compete.

The winners of the competition will enter the 2018 AFC Cup qualifying playoffs.

First round

Second round

Third round

Quarter-finals

Semi-finals

Final

References

2017
2017 domestic association football cups
Cup